Latinx is a neologism in American English which is used to refer to people of Latin American cultural or ethnic identity in the United States. The gender-neutral  suffix replaces the  ending of Latino and Latina that are typical of grammatical gender in Spanish. Its plural is Latinxs. Words used for similar purposes include Latin@, Latine, and the simple Latin. Related gender-neutral neologisms include Chicanx and Xicanx.

The term was first seen online around 2004. It has since been used in social media by activists, students, and academics who seek to advocate for non-binary and genderqueer individuals. Surveys of Hispanic and Latino Americans have found that the vast majority prefer other terms such as Hispanic and Latina/Latino to describe themselves, and that only 2–3% use Latinx. A 2020 Pew Research Center survey found that roughly three-quarters of U.S. Latinos were not aware of the term Latinx; of those aware of it, 33% (i.e., about 8% of all U.S. Latinos) said it should be used to describe their racial or ethnic group, while 65% said it should not.

Critics say the term does not follow traditional grammar, is difficult to pronounce, and is disrespectful toward conventional Spanish; the Royal Spanish Academy style guide does not recognize the suffix -x. Both supporters and opponents have cited linguistic imperialism as a reason for supporting or opposing the use of the term. Democratic members of the Black and Puerto Rican caucuses introduced legislation to ban its use in government documents, citing cultural appropriation by Americanizers who disfigure the Spanish language.

Usage and pronunciation 
Latinx is a term for a group identity used to describe individuals in the United States who have Latin American roots. Other names for this social category include Hispanic, Latino, Latina/o, Latine, and Latin@. Another term is simply "Latin", which by itself is of a neutral gender, and can be stated in the plural as "Latins". Latinx is used as an alternative to the gender binary inherent to formulations such as Latina/o and Latin@, and is used by and for anyone of Latin-American descent who do not identify as either male or female, or more broadly as a gender-neutral term for such.

Pronunciations of Latinx documented in dictionaries include  . Other variants respelled ad hoc as "Latins", "La-tinks", or "Latin-equis" have been reported. Editors at Merriam-Webster write that "more than likely, there was little consideration for how [Latinx] was supposed to be pronounced when it was created."

History

Origins 
The first records of the term Latinx appear in the 21st century, but there is no certainty as to its first occurrence. According to Google Trends, it was first seen online in 2004, and first appeared in academic literature around 2013 "in a Puerto Rican psychological periodical to challenge the gender binaries encoded in the Spanish language."  Contrarily, it has been claimed that usage of the term "started in online chat rooms and listservs in the 1990s" and that its first appearance in academic literature was in the Fall 2004 volume of the journal Feministas Unidas.   In the U.S. it was first used in activist and LGBT circles as a way to expand on earlier attempts at gender-inclusive forms of the grammatically masculine Latino, such as Latino/a and Latin@. Between 2004 and 2014, Latinx did not attain broad usage or attention.

Use of x to expand language can be traced to the word Chicano, which had an x added to the front of the word, making it Xicano. Scholars have identified this shift as part of the movement to empower people of Mexican origin in the U.S. and also as a means of emphasizing that the origins of the letter X and term Chicano are linked to the Indigenous Nahuatl language. The x has also been added to the end of the term Chicano, making it Chicanx. An example of this occurred at Columbia University where students changed their student group name from "Chicano Caucus" to "Chicanx Caucus". Later Columbia University changed the name of Latino Heritage Month to Latinx Hispanic Heritage Month. Salinas and Lozano (2017) state that the term is influenced by Mexican indigenous communities that have a third gender role, such as Juchitán de Zaragoza, Oaxaca. The term often refers specifically to LGBT people or to young people. Brian Latimer, a producer at MSNBC who identifies as nonbinary, says that the application of the term "shows a generational divide in the Hispanic community". In 2016, a student newspaper described the term as "sweeping across college campuses in the nation with the intent of creating inclusion while inadvertently pitting members of the Latino community into a cultural war". It received wider use after the 2016 Pulse nightclub shooting.

Public awareness and use 
, the term Latinx was used nearly exclusively in the United States. Manuel Vargas writes that people from Latin America ordinarily would not think of themselves using the term unless they reside in the United States. The term was added to the Merriam-Webster English dictionary in 2018, as it continued to grow in popularity in the United States, and to the Oxford English Dictionary in 2019.

Jeffrey Herlihy-Mera writes that in Puerto Rico, the "shift toward x in reference to people has already occurred" in limited academic settings and "for many faculty [in the humanities department at the University of Puerto Rico] hermanx and niñx and their equivalents have been the standard ... for years. It is clear that the inclusive approach to nouns and adjectives is becoming more common, and while it may at some point become the prevailing tendency, presently there is no prescriptive control toward either syntax".

Many people became more aware of the term in the month following the Orlando nightclub shooting of June 2016; Google Trends shows that searches for this term rose greatly in this period. A similar use of 'x' in the term Mx. may have been an influence or model for the development of Latinx.

At Princeton University the Latinx Perspective Organization was founded in 2016 to "unify Princeton's diverse Latinx community" and several student-run organizations at other institutions have used the word in their title.

The term appears in the titles of academic books in the context of LGBT studies, rhetoric and composition studies, and comics studies.

On June 26, 2019, during the first 2020 Democratic Party presidential debate, the word was used by the presidential candidate Elizabeth Warren, who is not Hispanic or Latina, which USA Today called "one of the highest profile uses of the term since its conception".

A 2019 poll (with a 5% margin of error) found that 2% of US residents of Latin American descent in the US use Latinx, including 3% of 18–34-year-olds; the rest preferred other terms. "No respondents over [age] 50 selected the term", while overall "3% of women and 1% of men selected the term as their preferred ethnic identifier".

A 2020 Pew Research Center survey found that only 23% of US adults who self-identified as Hispanic or Latino had heard of the term Latinx. Of those, 65% said that the term Latinx should not be used to describe them, with most preferring terms such as Hispanic or Latino. While the remaining 33% of US Hispanic adults who have heard the term Latinx said it could be used to describe the community, only 10% of that subgroup preferred it to the terms Hispanic or Latino. The preferred term both among Hispanics who have heard the term and among those who have not was Hispanic, garnering 50% and 64% respectively. Latino was second in preference with 31% and 29% respectively. Only 3% self identified as Latinx in that survey.

A 2020 study based on interviews with 34 Latinx/a/o students from the US found that they "perceive higher education as a privileged space where they use the term Latinx. Once they return to their communities, they do not use the term".

A 2021 Gallup poll asked Hispanic Americans about their preference among the terms "Hispanic," "Latino" and "Latinx". 57% said it did not matter, and 4% chose Latinx. In a follow-up question where they were asked which term they lean toward, 5% chose Latinx.

A 2021 poll by Democratic Hispanic outreach firm Bendixen & Amandi International found that only 2 percent of those polled refer to themselves as Latinx, while 68 percent call themselves “Hispanic” and 21 percent favored “Latino” or “Latina” to describe their ethnic background. In addition, 40 percent of those polled said Latinx bothers or offends them to some degree and 30 percent said they would be less likely to support a politician or organization that uses the term.

The League of United Latin American Citizens decided to drop the term from its official communication in 2021.

In literature and academia 
Latinx has become commonly used by activists in higher education and the popular media who seek to advocate for individuals on the borderlines of gender identity. Herlihy-Mera calls Latinx "a recognition of the exclusionary nature of our institutions, of the deficiencies in existent linguistic structures, and of language as an agent of social change", saying, "The gesture toward linguistic intersectionality stems from a suffix endowed with a literal intersection—x." Some commentators, such as Ed Morales, a lecturer at Columbia University and author of the 2018 book Latinx: The New Force in American Politics and Culture, associate the term with the ideas of Gloria Anzaldúa, a Chicana feminist. Morales writes that "refusal to conform to male/female gender binaries" parallels "the refusal to conform to a racial binary".

Scharrón-del Río and Aja (2015) have traced the use of Latinx by authors Beatriz Llenín Figueroa, Jaime Géliga Quiñones, Yuderkys Espinosa Miñoso, and Adriana Gallegos Dextre. The term has also been discussed in scholarly research by cultural theorist Ilan Stavans on Spanglish and by Frederick Luis Aldama and Christopher Gonzalez on Latinx super heroes in mainstream comics and Latinx graphic novels such as United States of Banana. The term and concept of Latinx is also explored by Antonio Pastrana Jr, Juan Battle and Angelique Harris on LBGTQ+ issues. Valdes also uses the term in research on black perspectives on Latinx.

A 2020 analysis found "that community college professional organizations have by and large not adopted the term Latinx, even by organizations with a Latinx/a/o centered mission", although some academic journals and dissertations about community colleges were using it.

In politics
Some Republicans argue that the word is a product of liberal "wokeism", while some Democrats argue that it disfigures the Spanish language and is an act of cultural appropriation.

In January 2023, Republican Governor of Arkansas Sarah Huckabee Sanders issued the Executive Order to Respect the Latino Community by Eliminating Culturally Insensitive words from Official Use in Government, banning the use of Latinx in official Arkansas government communications.

In February 2023, a group of Hispanic Connecticut lawmakers, including five Democrats, proposed a similar ban on formal state documents, calling the term offensive to Spanish speakers. State Representative Geraldo Reyes Jr., who introduced the measure, called the term "offensive and unnecessary."

Reception

Latinx has been the subject of controversy. Linguistic imperialism has been used as a basis of both criticism and support.

In 2018, the Royal Spanish Academy rejected the use of -x and -e as gender-neutral alternatives to the collective masculine -o ending, in a style manual published together with the Asociación de Academias de la Lengua Española (ASALE). Regarding this decision, Darío Villanueva, RAE's director said, "The problem is we're confusing grammar with machismo." According to HuffPost, some refuse to use the term on the grounds that Latinx is difficult to pronounce in the Spanish language.

Linguists Janet M. Fuller and Jennifer Leeman state that some people reject the use of Latinx to refer to people regardless of gender because they see it as a one-size-fits-all term that erases diversity, preferring to switch between -o/-a/-x when referring to specific individuals. Those who oppose the term in its entirety have argued that the -x is artificial, unpronounceable, an imposition of English norms on Spanish, or overly faddish.

Some non-binary Latinos whose first language is not English have also criticized the term on the basis that it caters more to Latin Americans who are fluent in English and can pronounce the -x ending easily while ignoring gender neutral alternatives already employed by Latin American activists, such as -e.

Cultural Strategist Henry Cadena mentions in an article published by Manomagazine that numbers are now showing that the term Latinx has evolved to be an offensive term and that some even call it a racial slur.

Linguist John McWhorter argues that, in contrast to other neologisms such as African American, Latinx has not become mainstream  because the problem of implied gender it aims to solve is more a concern of the intelligentsia than the "proverbial person on the street".

Matthew Yglesias of Vox, discussing Donald Trump's gains among Hispanic voters in the 2020 United States presidential election, stated that for Democrats, while other factors played a larger role, the term "is, if nothing else, a symptom of the problem, which is a tendency to privilege academic concepts and linguistic innovations in addressing social justice concerns." He says that "[t]he message of the term... is that the entire grammatical system of the Spanish language is problematic, which in any other context progressives would recognize as an alienating and insensitive message." Democratic congressman Ruben Gallego, who represents a heavily working-class Hispanic district in Arizona, advises Democrats not to use the term. Members of the Congressional Hispanic Caucus are hesitant to use the term until after usage continues to evolve to make it more common, according to California representative Raul Ruiz.

According to HuffPost, "Many opponents of the term have suggested that using an un-gendered noun like Latinx is disrespectful to the Spanish language and some have even called the term 'a blatant form of linguistic imperialism. Defending usage of the term against critics arguing linguistic imperialism, Brooklyn College professors María R. Scharrón-del Río and Alan A. Aja argue that the Spanish language itself is a form of linguistic imperialism for Latin Americans.

Another argument against Latinx is that "it erases feminist movements in the 1970s" that fought for use of the word Latina to represent women, according to George Cadava, Director of the Latina and Latino Studies program at Northwestern University.

Writing for Latino Rebels, Hector Luis Alamo describes the term as a "bulldozing of Spanish". In a 2015 article published by the outlet as part of a debate on the term, Alamo wrote: "If we dump Latino for Latinx because it offends some people, then we should go on dumping words forever since there will always be some people who find some words offensive."

Wayne State University professor Nicole Trujillo-Pagán has argued that patriarchal bias is reproduced in ostensibly "gender neutral" language and stated, "Less clear in the debate (as it has developed since then) is how the replacement silences and erases long-standing struggles to recognize the significance of gender difference and sexual violence."

A 2019 National Survey of Latinos found that only 3 percent of Hispanic-Latinos have ever used "Latinx" to describe themselves. The League of United Latin American Citizens announced in 2021 that it would stop using the term in its official communications, calling it "very unliked" by nearly all Latinos.

Similar terms 

Similar gender-neutral forms have also arisen. Similar terms include Chicanx and the variant spelling Xicanx.

Latine (plural: Latines) as a gender-neutral term is less prevalent than Latinx within the U.S., although the opposite is true throughout the Spanish-speaking world. In the U.S., "Latine" arose out of genderqueer speakers' use of the ending ;  similar forms include amigue ('friend') and elle (singular 'they'). According to The New York Times, the  ending has been more widely adopted because it is easier to pronounce.

See also

 Feminist language reform
 Gender neutrality in languages with grammatical gender
 Gender neutrality in English
 Grammatical gender in Spanish
 Gender neutrality in Portuguese
 Hispanic–Latino naming dispute
 Mx (title)
 Spanish orthography
 Womxn
 Womyn

Notes

References

Further reading
 
 
 
 
 
 
 

2000s neologisms
2004 neologisms
American political neologisms
Hispanic and Latino
Gender-neutral language
Nonstandard spelling
Spanish grammar
Spanish language in the United States
Linguistic controversies
LGBT Hispanic and Latino American culture